Capcom is a Japanese video game development and publishing company formed from a merger on June 11, 1983. In addition to arcade and consumer video games, it also produced a number of pinball games and non-video arcade games. The company is known for several game series which became mega-million franchises, such as Street Fighter, Marvel vs. Capcom, Mega Man, Resident Evil, Devil May Cry, Dead Rising, Monster Hunter, Sengoku Basara, Onimusha and Ace Attorney. The company has developed or published hundreds of titles in several video game franchises on numerous gaming platforms.

Capcom released numerous games in regions outside Japan, such as North America, Southeast Asia and Europe. Often the game names were changed for that region. The titles used in the table are the English titles, unless they were released only in Japan.

Sections

List of Capcom games: 0–D

List of Capcom games: E–L

List of Capcom games: M

List of Capcom games: N–R

List of Capcom games: S

List of Capcom games: T–Z

Franchises
1942
Ace Attorney
Bionic Commando
Breath of Fire
Buster Bros.
Darkstalkers
Dead Rising
Devil May Cry
Dino Crisis
Dragon's Dogma
Final Fight
Gaist Crusher
Ghosts 'n Goblins
Lost Planet
Marvel vs. Capcom
Mega Man
Monster Hunter
Ōkami
Onimusha
Power Stone
Resident Evil
Rival Schools
Sengoku Basara
Star Gladiator
Steel Battalion
Street Fighter
Strider
Viewtiful Joe

References

Capcom